The 1988 Newsweek Champions Cup was a tennis tournament played on outdoor hard courts. It was the 15th edition of the Indian Wells Masters and was part of the 1988 Nabisco Grand Prix. It was played at the Grand Champions Resort in Indian Wells, California in the United States from February 29 through March 7, 1988.

Finals

Singles

 Boris Becker defeated  Emilio Sánchez 7–5, 6–4, 2–6, 6–4
 It was Becker's 3rd title of the year and the 21st of his career.

Doubles

 Boris Becker /  Guy Forget defeated  Jorge Lozano /  Todd Witsken 6–4, 6–4
 It was Becker's 2nd title of the year and the 20th of his career. It was Forget's 1st title of the year and the 15th of his career.

References

External links

 Association of Tennis Professionals (ATP) tournament profile

 
Newsweek Champions Cup
1988 Newsweek Champions Cup
Newsweek Champions Cup
News
Newsweek Champions Cup
Newsweek Champions Cup